Porbandar Airport  is a public airport in Porbandar, Gujarat, India. Currently, civilian flights are not operational. Apart from civilian operations it also has a military presence in the form of  INAS 343 of the Indian Navy and CGAE Porbandar of the Indian Coast Guard. A new terminal building was opened in April 2008.

Structure
The building has six Check-in Counters and two Conveyor Belts in the Arrivals hall and can handle 100 arriving and 100 departing passengers at a time.

Airlines and destinations
No scheduled flights are operational at present.

Military Enclaves

Naval Air Enclave
 INAS 343, Unmanned Aerial Vehicle (UAV) Squadron,  was commissioned at the Naval Air Enclave, Porbandar in January 2011. This is the first Operational UAV Squadron under the Western Naval Command. Nicknamed ‘Frontier Formidables’, the Squadron operates IAI Heron and IAI Searcher MkII UAVs and has the dual tasks of undertaking operational missions besides providing training.
INAS 314 "Raptors" a new EW squadron was established on 29 November 2019. This squadron is responsible to undertake maritime surveillance in North Arabian Sea. Dornier 228 is currently operated by this squadron.

CGAE Porbandar
Coast Guard Air Enclave, Porbandar, was commissioned on 12 June 2008. It provides logistical and administrative support to the Dornier Flight and 850 Sqn (ICG) which operates the Advanced Light Helicopter (ALH).

See also
 Indian navy 
 List of Indian Navy bases
 List of active Indian Navy ships

 Integrated commands and units
 Armed Forces Special Operations Division
 Defence Cyber Agency
 Integrated Defence Staff
 Integrated Space Cell
 Indian Nuclear Command Authority
 Indian Armed Forces
 Special Forces of India

 Other lists
 Strategic Forces Command
 List of Indian Air Force stations
 List of Indian Navy bases
 India's overseas military bases

References

External links
Official site

Airports in Gujarat
Indian Naval Air Stations
Porbandar
Year of establishment missing